Hvidsten may refer to:

People
 Ragnar Hvidsten (1926-2016), Norwegian football player

Places

Other
 Hvidsten Group, Danish WWII resistance group
 Hvidsten Inn, historic Danish inn